Emmy Lischke (1860-1919) was a German painter known for her landscapes and still lifes.

Biography
Lischke was born on November 13, 1860 in Elberfeld, Germany. She was the daughter of Alwine von der Heydt and Elberfeld mayor Karl Emil Lischke. She studied painting in Dusseldorf and then continued her studies at the Academy of Fine Arts, Munich. She exhibited her work at the Woman's Building at the 1893 World's Columbian Exposition in Chicago, Illinois.

Lischke died on May 14, 1914 in Munich.

Exhibitions (selection) 

 1891: Munich annual exhibition of works of art from all nations in the glass palace - paintings wildflowers , flowers 
 1893: Annual exhibition in Munich of works of art from all nations in the glass palace – paintings forest weaving , evening , love spring 
 1893: Great Berlin Art Exhibition – Paintings at the Spring 
 1893: World's Columbian Exposition (Chicago World's Fair), Rotunda of the Women's Pavilion - Field Flowers painting
 1894: Great Berlin Art Exhibition – Painting Forest Weaving, evening 
 1894: Gallery Eduard Schulte, Dusseldorf
 1895: International art exhibition of the Munich Secession Association of Fine Artists - oil painting autumn 
 1895: Great Berlin art exhibition - paintings, still lifes
 1896: International Art Exhibition Berlin - Painting Autumn Storm 
 1898: 16th art exhibition of the Association of Female Artists and Art Friends in Berlin in the building of the Royal Academy of Arts in Berlin, Unter den Linden 38 – painting autumn storm 
 1899: Munich Annual Exhibition in the Glass Palace - Paintings Holy Grove, In the Storm 
 1899: Great Berlin Art Exhibition - Paintings On the Black Water, Before the Thunderstorm 
 1901: Great Berlin Art Exhibition - Painting Sacred Grove 
 1902: Munich Annual Exhibition in the Glass Palace – Painting Summer Morning and a Portrait 
 1902: Galerie Eduard Schulte, Berlin – paintings 
 1902: Great Berlin Art Exhibition – Paintings Rigid World, Lonely Cape 
 1903: Exhibition in the Künstlerhaus in Munich on the occasion of the conference of the 3rd Bavarian Women's Day 
 1906: Munich Annual Exhibition in the Glass Palace - Paintings by the Sea 
 1907: Kölnischer Kunstverein – 12 paintings 
 1908: Munich Annual Exhibition in the Glass Palace - Paintings by the Sea 
 1909: 10th International Art Exhibition in the Glass Palace – painting silver poplars 
 1910: Munich annual exhibition in the glass palace - oil painting Mondnacht 
 1910: Great Berlin art exhibition - paintings by the sea, silver poplar grove 
 1911: Jubilee exhibition of the Munich artists' association in honor of the 90th birthday of Prince Regent Luitpold of Bavaria in the Glass Palace - oil painting Grauer Tag, Marine 
 1911: Baden-Baden art exhibition – paintings 
 1913: Munich art exhibition in the glass palace – oil painting Cloudy Day 
 1913: Great Berlin Art Exhibition - Painting Summer Day, The Sea 
 1916: Munich art exhibition in the glass palace - oil painting The Wave, In the harbor, roses 
 1916: Great Berlin Art Exhibition – Summer Paintings 
 1917: Munich art exhibition in the glass palace - oil paintings hyacinths, roses 
 1918: Munich art exhibition in the glass palace - oil painting bathing beach, low tide 
 1919: Munich art exhibition in the glass palace – oil painting on the Breton coast 
 1941: Kunstverein Munich – paintings

Literature 

 Friedrich von Boetticher : paintings of the nineteenth century. Contribution to Art History . Volume I, Dresden 1891, p. 887. (digital copy)
 Anton Hirsch: The visual artists of modern times. Ferdinand Enke Verlag, Stuttgart 1905.
 Hermann Alexander Müller : Allgemeines Künstler-Lexicon , Volume 5, Hans Wolfgang Singer (ed.), Rütten & Loening 1921, p. 190. (Digital copy)
 Richard Braungart : Emmy Lischke. In: Art for everyone. Aug. 1922, pp. 345-351. (digitized)
 Hans Vollmer (ed.): Founded by Ulrich Thieme and Felix Becker . tape 23 : Leitenstorfer–Mander . EA Seemann, Leipzig 1929, p. 281-282 .
 Joachim Busse (ed.): International handbook of all painters and sculptors of the 19th century. Busse Art Documentation GmbH, Wiesbaden 1977, ISBN 3-9800062-0-4 .
 Horst Ludwig: Munich painting in the 19th century. Hirmer Verlag , Munich 1978.
 Uwe Eckardt: The Elberfeld painter Emmy Lischke (1860-1919). In: History in Wuppertal. Volume 3, 1994, pp. 115-118.
 Hans Paffrath (ed.): Lexicon of the Düsseldorf school of painting 1819-1918. Volume 2: Haach-Murtfeldt. Published by the Düsseldorf Art Museum in the Ehrenhof and by the Paffrath Gallery. Bruckmann, Munich 1998, ISBN 3-7654-3010-2 .
 Bénézit Dictionary of Artists. 1999 (in English or French)

References

External links
  
 images of Lischke's work on ArtNet

1860 births
1919 deaths
German women painters
19th-century German women artists
20th-century German women artists
19th-century German painters
20th-century German painters
People from Elberfeld
Artists from Wuppertal